Kesté Pizza & Vino, also known as Kesté Pizzeria or simply Keste's, is a pizzeria, located in Manhattan, that serves Neapolitan-style wood-fired brick oven pizza. As of 2015, it is the fourth-highest rated pizzeria in the United States on TripAdvisor. The Bleecker Street restaurant had permanently closed due to the coronavirus pandemic by October 2021, although there remained a secondary location open in FiDi. Wrote TimeOut about the Bleecker Street location, "it ushered in a wave of thin pies with puffy pockets of air and tiny black blisters across the city."

History
Kesté's was founded in 2009 by Roberto Caporuscio, who works alongside his daughter, Giorgia. Keste's is located on Bleecker Street next to John's. The restaurant was rated as the fourth best pizza in the United States and second best in New York City.

New York Magazine and Food Network Magazine named Kesté's the best pizza in New York. The Bleecker Street restaurant had permanently closed due to the coronavirus pandemic by October 2021, although there remained a secondary location open in FiDi. Wrote TimeOut about the Bleecker Street location, "it ushered in a wave of thin pies with puffy pockets of air and tiny black blisters across the city."

See also
 List of Italian restaurants
 List of restaurants in New York City

References

External links
 

2009 establishments in New York City
Pizzerias in New York City
Restaurants established in 2009
Restaurants in Manhattan